Limited series may refer to:

Limited series, individual storylines within an anthology series
Limited series, a particular run of collectables, usually individually numbered
Limited series (comics), a comics series with a predetermined number of issues
Limited series (television), a television show with a predetermined number of episodes telling a complete story arc, usually longer than a miniseries
The Limited Series (1998 album), a box set by Garth Brooks
The Limited Series (2005 album), an unrelated box set by Garth Brooks